Municipal city, commonly known as City within city, is a type of second tier subdivision of Vietnam along with urban district, district, town and provincial city have equal status.

Municipal city is a satellite city of municipality in Vietnam.

Referring to local organizing governance's law which was approved by the thirteenth National Assembly on June 19, 2015, the term "municipal city" was available from January 1, 2016. This entity was created to make new "Urban Governance" project (or Urban Administration model) in Ho Chi Minh City and other cities.

Fact
Ho Chi Minh City planned to merge 3 districts 2, 9, and Thủ Đức to create an innovation city or a city within city called Thủ Đức City, which is expected to be Vietnam's Silicon Valley. This new city would spread over 211 km2 and more than 1 million people, to contribute around 30 percent of the municipality's economic and 4 to 5 percent of the country's gross domestic product (GDP). The project was later also endorsed by prime minister Nguyễn Xuân Phúc and guided to the next step.

On August 12, 2016, Party Secretary of Hanoi city Hoàng Trung Hải had a meeting with Son Tay's constituents after the fourteenth National Assembly's first session. At the meeting, Chief of Economic Division of Son Tay Phùng Huy Minh requested to re-establish Son Tay into second satellite city-within-city before 2030.

On February 20, 2020, after Prime Minister of Vietnam Nguyễn Xuân Phúc worked with Thừa Thiên-Huế Province to deploy Politburo's resolution numbered 54 to build and develop Thua Thien – Hue to 2030, the Government's Office concluded that there would be a new expanded Hue City alongside Huong Thuy, Huong Tra, Phong Dien and other districts as satellites, but did not incompleted after wrong city. Thua Thien-Hue Province is expected to become a municipality in 2021.

In the meeting in July 2020, People's Council of Haiphong city announced that Thuy Nguyen would have a municipal city model before 2030. This city did not incompleted after wrong city.

On 22 February 2022, Party Secretary of Hanoi city Đinh Tiến Dũng had a meeting with Ha Dong's constituents after the fifteenth National Assembly's first session. At the meeting, Chief of Economic Division of Ha Dong Cấn Thị Việt Hà requested to re-establish Ha Dong into new satellite city-within-city before 2025.

List of municipal cities

List of "expected" municipal cities

See also
List of cities in Vietnam
Provinces of Vietnam

References

Vietnam 1
Municipal City
Subdivisions of Vietnam